Christina the Astonishing (c.1150 – 24 July 1224), also known as Christina Mirabilis, was a Christian holy woman born in Brustem (near Sint-Truiden), Belgium. She was considered a saint in her own time, and for centuries following her death, as noted by her appearance in the Fasti Mariani Calendar of Saints of 1630, and Butler's Lives of the Saints - Concise Edition, published in the 18th century.

Her notability began when she was 21 years old. About to be buried and already in the church resting in an open coffin, according to the custom of the time, during the Agnus Dei of her funeral Mass, she arose, stupefying the whole city of St. Trond. She subsequently lived a long life, dying at the age of 74.

She is recognized as a saint by the Catholic Church and commemorated in the current edition of the Roman Martyrology on 24 July, the day of her death.

Some think that Christina receives attention today as much for the curious descriptions of her miracles as for her faith.

Life 
Christina was born to a religious family, the youngest of three daughters. After being orphaned at the age of fifteen, she worked taking the herds to pasture. She suffered a massive seizure when she was in her early twenties. Her condition was so severe that witnesses assumed she had died. A funeral was held, but during the service, "she arose full of vigor, stupefying with amazement the whole city of Sint-Truiden, which had witnessed this wonder. She levitated up to the rafters, later explaining that she could not bear the smell of the sinful people there."

She related that she had witnessed Heaven, Hell and Purgatory. She said that as soon as her soul was separated from her body, angels conducted it to a very gloomy place, entirely filled with souls enduring such torments that it was impossible to describe them. She claimed that she had been offered a choice of either  remaining in heaven or returning to earth to perform penance in order to deliver souls from the flames of Purgatory. Christina agreed to return to life and in that instant stood up. She told those around her that she had returned to life for the sole purpose of bringing relief to the departed and conversion to sinners. 
Christina renounced all of life's comforts, reduced herself to extreme destitution, dressed in rags, lived without home or hearth, and not content with these privations eagerly sought out all that could cause her suffering. At first, she fled human contact and, suspected of being possessed, was jailed. Upon her release, she took up the practice of extreme penance.

Thomas of Cantimpré, then a canon regular who was a professor of theology, wrote a report eight years after her death, based on the accounts of those who knew her. 

Thus, argues Bellarmine, "God willed to silence those libertines who make open profession of believing in nothing, and who have the audacity to ask in scorn, Who has returned from the other world? Who has ever seen the torments of Hell or Purgatory? Behold two witnesses. They assure us that they have seen them and that they are dreadful. What follows, then, if not that the incredulous is inexcusable, and that those who believe and nevertheless neglect to do penance are still more to be condemned?"

The reference was to Cardinal Jacques de Vitry, who met her and recounted that she would throw herself into burning furnaces and there suffer great tortures for extended times, uttering frightful cries, yet coming forth with no sign of burns upon her. In winter she would plunge into the frozen Meuse River for hours and even days and weeks at a time, all the while praying to God and imploring his mercy. She sometimes allowed herself to be carried by the currents downriver to a mill where the wheel "whirled her round in a manner frightful to behold", yet she never suffered any dislocations or broken bones. She was chased by dogs which bit her. 

After being jailed a second time, upon her release she moderated her approach somewhat. Christina died at the Dominican Convent  of Saint Catherine in Sint-Truiden, of natural causes, aged 74. The prioress there later testified that, despite her behaviour, Christina would humbly and fully obey any command given her by the prioress.

In his commentaries to a new edition of the Latin text, the French historian Sylvain Piron suggests that she was only about 12 at the time of her apparent death. Her birth should rather be placed around 1170 than 1150.

Modern interpretations
While for some Christina's Vita is an example of credulous medieval superstition, historian Barbara Newman finds that there is reason to understand Christina's behavior in terms of hysteria.

Patronage 
St Christina the Astonishing has been recognized as a saint since the 12th century. She was placed in the calendar of the saints by at least two bishops of the Catholic Church in two different centuries (17th & 19th) that also recognized her life in a religious order and preservation of her relics. The Catholic Church allows and recognizes veneration of saints upheld by the laity; canonization is understood as a re-affirming of the more notable examples of Christian life as mentioned in the Catechism of the Catholic Church, and Saint Christina the Astonishing, having early Church recognition, is due her title of Saint as stated by the Church's Magisterium and Sacred Tradition.

Veneration of Christina the Astonishing has never been formally approved by the Catholic Church, but there remains a strong devotion to her in her native region of Limburg. Prayers are traditionally said to Christina to seek her intercession for millers, for those suffering from mental illness, and for mental health workers.

Cultural references
Christina's story inspired the Nick Cave song "Christina the Astonishing", from the album Henry's Dream.
Poets Jane Draycott and Lesley Saunders re-told her story in their collection Christina the Astonishing.
Christina is the subject of a school pageant in an episode of the Showtime television series, Nurse Jackie; the episode is entitled "The Astonishing".
Kirstin Valdez Quade wrote a short story called "Christina the Astonishing (1150-1224)", published by The New Yorker on their website on July 24, 2017, the 793rd anniversary of Christina's death.

See also

St Lutgardis
List of Catholic saints

References

Literature

Thomas de Cantimpré, The Life of Christina the Astonishing. Ed. Margot H. King. Toronto, 1999. 
Medieval Saints: A Reader. Ed. Mary-Ann Stouck. Toronto, 1999. .
Jennifer N. Brown, Three Women of Liège: A Critical Edition and Commentary on the Middle English Lives of Elizabeth of Spalbeek, Christina Mirabilis, and Marie d'Oignies. Turnhout: Brepols, 2009. .

External links
 
 Christina the Astonishing on BALaT - Belgian Art Links and Tools (KIK-IRPA, Brussels)

1150s births
1224 deaths
12th-century venerated Christians
13th-century venerated Christians
Belgian Roman Catholic saints
Folk saints
People from Limburg (Belgium)
Women of medieval Belgium
Christian female saints of the Middle Ages
12th-century women of the Holy Roman Empire
13th-century women of the Holy Roman Empire